Gokwe North Rural District Councils  is a local government organ administering Gokwe North District. 
There are eight Rural District Councils in the Midlands Province of Zimbabwe all established in terms of the Zimbabwe Rural District Councils Act; Chapter 29.13.

Background

Gokwe North RDC is one of the 8 rural district councils in Midlands Province namely

Mberengwa RDC in Mberengwa District, 
Runde RDC in Zvishavane District, 
Tongogara RDC in Shurugwi District, 
Vungu RDC in Gweru District, 
Takawira RDC in Chirumhanzu District, 
Zibagwe RDC in Kwekwe District, 
Gokwe South RDC in Gokwe South District 
and here in Gokwe North District is this rural district council.

Gokwe North District is the furthest north of the province. Unlike its neighbour Gokwe South District which has and urban settlement within it, this district is all rural. Its capital is Mutora District Service Center where Gokwe North RDC operates from.. 
There are 36 wards under Gokwe North RDC evenly distributed in 4 constituencies; 
Gokwe-Chireya 9,
Gokwe-Gumunyu,
Gokwe-Kabuyuni 9 and 
Gokwe-Nembudziya 9.
.

2013 - 2018 Councillors

Source: Zimbabwe Electoral Commission

2008 - 2013 Councillors

Source: Kubatana Aechive

See also

 Gokwe North District
 Gokwe South RDC

References

Districts of Midlands Province
[[Category:Second-level administrative country
subdivisions]]